Pikeminnows, formerly squawfish,  are cyprinid fish of the genus Ptychocheilus consisting of four species native to western North America. Voracious predators, they are considered an "undesirable" species in many waters, largely due to the species' perceived tendency to prey upon small trout and salmon. First known in western science by the common name Columbia River dace, the four species all became lumped under the offensive name "squawfish". In 1999, the American Fisheries Society adopted "pikeminnow" as the name it recommends, because Native Americans considered "squawfish" offensive.

The Colorado pikeminnow, P. lucius, is the largest member of the genus, ranging from 4 to 9 lb (2 to 4 kg) in adult fish with occasional specimens up to 25 lb (11 kg). Historical and anecdotal reports of Colorado pikeminnows nearing 6 feet (1.8 m) in length and 80 lb (36 kg) in weight have been made. The species is near extinction in its native Colorado River Basin habitat, due to extensive habitat destruction.

Anglers are paid for each Northern pikeminnow that they catch (from within program boundaries) that is 9 inches or larger in total length, and the more you catch, the higher the reward. Rewards begin at $5 each for the first 25 Northern Pikeminnow caught during the season. Anglers are paid $6 for each fish they catch from 26-200, and $8 for every fish caught over 200 cumulatively.  Anglers are also paid $500 for each specially tagged Northern Pikeminnow!

Species 
The four recognized species are:

 Ptychocheilus grandis (Ayres, 1854) (Sacramento pikeminnow)
 Ptychocheilus lucius Girard, 1856 (Colorado pikeminnow)
 Ptychocheilus oregonensis (J. Richardson, 1836) (Northern pikeminnow)
 Ptychocheilus umpquae Snyder, 1908 (Umpqua pikeminnow)

References